Electronic Transactions on Numerical Analysis  is a 
peer-reviewed scientific open access journal  publishing original research in 
applied mathematics with the focus on numerical analysis and 
scientific computing. 
It is published by the Kent State University and the  Johann Radon Institute for Computational and 
Applied Mathematics (RICAM). Articles for this journal are published in electronic form 
on the journal's web site.  The journal is one of the oldest scientific open access journals in 
mathematics.

The Electronic Transactions on Numerical Analysis were
founded in 1992 by Richard S. Varga, Arden Ruttan, and  
Lothar Reichel (all  Kent State University) as a fully open access journal (no fee for reader or authors). 
The first issue appeared in September 1993. 
The current editors-in-chief are  Lothar Reichel and Ronny Ramlau.

Editors-in-chief
 1993–2008: Richard S. Varga
 1993–1998: Arden Ruttan
 2005–2013: Daniel Szyld
 since 1993: Lothar Reichel
 since 2010: Ronny Ramlau

No-fee open access and copyright
Since its foundation, the journal follows an open access policy that allows free access to readers and charges no fee for authors ("diamond open access"). Authors transfer the copyright of published articles to the editors. This publication model is based on the one hand on support of the editing institutions and on donations. On the other hand, the editing process is carried out by volunteers from the scientific community.

Abstracting and indexing 
The journal is abstracted and indexed in the
Science Citation Index Expanded
Mathematical Reviews, 
and Zentralblatt MATH. 
According to the Journal Citation Reports, 
the journal has a 2015 impact factor of 
0.671 (highest 1.261 in 2012)

External links 
 Official website (RICAM)
 Official website (Kent)

References 

Publications established in 1992
Mathematics journals
Open access journals
English-language journals